Vladyslav Obraztsov (born 3 September 1994) is a Ukrainian professional footballer.

In March 2014, Obraztsov signed deal with FC Dnepr until 2016, but in December 2014, he left the team.

References

External links

1994 births
Living people
Ukrainian footballers
Association football midfielders
Ukrainian expatriate footballers
Ukrainian expatriate sportspeople in Belarus
Expatriate footballers in Belarus
FC Dnepr Mogilev players
FC Mynai players